Harry McNaughton (born 6 April 1894, date of death unknown) was a Scottish footballer who played as a goalkeeper.

External links
 LFC History profile

1894 births
Year of death missing
Scottish footballers
Liverpool F.C. players
Heart of Midlothian F.C. players
St Bernard's F.C. players
Leith Athletic F.C. players
Association football goalkeepers
Footballers from Edinburgh